Dance in the Dark (ダンスインザダーク, June 5, 1993 – January 2, 2020) was a Japanese Thoroughbred racehorse. He was sired by Sunday Silence with the dam Dancing Key (sire Nijinsky II).

Career

Racing as a three-year-old, he defeated Fusaichi Concorde (winner of Japanese Derby) by Kikuka Sho (JPN Domestic GI, Japanese St. Leger), and was second in the Tokyo Yushun (JPN Domestic GI, Japanese Derby). Champion 3yo colt in Japan, 1996.

Sire career

Dance in the Dark was a successful sire in Japan.

 #1 - First season sire (2000)
 Leading Sire (JRA) - #13 (2001) → #9 (2002) → #3 (2003) → #2 (2004) → #4 (2005) → #4 (2006) → #3 (2007) → #3 (2008) → #3 (2009)

Stud career
Dance in the Dark's descendants include:

c = colt, f = filly

Pedigree

References

1993 racehorse births
2020 racehorse deaths
Racehorses bred in Japan
Racehorses trained in Japan
Thoroughbred family 7